The 2021 Lošinj Open was a professional tennis tournament played on clay courts. It was the first edition of the tournament which was part of the 2021 ATP Challenger Tour. It took place in Lošinj, Croatia between 18 and 24 October 2021.

Singles main-draw entrants

Seeds

 1 Rankings are as of 4 October 2021.

Other entrants
The following players received wildcards into the singles main draw:
  Victor Vlad Cornea
  Anthony Genov
  Mili Poljičak

The following players received entry into the singles main draw as alternates:
  Raúl Brancaccio
  Álvaro López San Martín
  Aldin Šetkić

The following players received entry from the qualifying draw:
  Nicolás Álvarez Varona
  Arjun Kadhe
  Georgii Kravchenko
  Filip Misolic

Champions

Singles

  Carlos Taberner def.  Marco Cecchinato Walkover.

Doubles

  Andrej Martin /  Tristan-Samuel Weissborn def.  Victor Vlad Cornea /  Ergi Kırkın 6–1, 7–6(7–5).

References

Lošinj Open
2021 in Croatian tennis
October 2021 sports events in Croatia